Jelavić is a Croatian and Serbian surname. Notable people with the surname include:

Anđa Jelavić (born 1980), Croatian women's basketball player
Ante Jelavić (born 1963), Bosnian Croat politician
Igor Jelavić (born 1962), Croatian footballer
Mario Jelavić (born 1993), Croatian footballer
Matko Jelavić (born 1950), Croatian singer, songwriter, composer and drummer
Nikica Jelavić (born 1985), Croatian footballer

In popular culture
 Irina Jelavić, a Serbian assassin in Assassination Classroom

Croatian surnames